The Saturday Night Seder was a Passover Seder held on April 11, 2020 by StoryCourse in response to the COVID-19 pandemic; to provide relief and support to the public in an effort to combat the spread of the COVID-19 virus. The seder was sponsored by BuzzFeed and aired on their Tasty YouTube channel.

Overview
The seder was hosted by Jason Alexander on the fourth night of Passover. The Saturday Seder coincided with the COVID-19 pandemic, which resulted in many physical seders being canceled throughout the world. The seder aimed to raise funds to benefit the CDC Foundation's Coronavirus Emergency Response Fund. In total, the seder raised more than $2.9 million for charity.

The seder covered the story of the Jewish Exodus from Egypt in a humorous light. It featured both Jews and non-Jews.

Participants

Appearances

Pamela Adlon
Julie Klausner
Fran Drescher
David Wolpe*
Kendell Pinkney
Mayim Bialik
Dana Benson*
Ilana and Eliot Glazer
Debra Messing
Richard Kind
Judith Light
Amichai Lau-Lavie*
Michael Solomonov
Dan Levy
Andy Cohen
Nick Kroll
Finn Wolfhard
Joshua Malina
Judy Gold
Michael Zegen
Jimmy Wolk
D'Arcy Carden
Billy Eichner
Reza Aslan
Tan France
Beanie Feldstein
Isaac Mizrahi
Sarah Hurwitz
Jessica Chaffin (as Ronna Glickman)
Chuck Schumer
Nina West
Mordechai Lightstone*
Alex Edelman
Sharon Brous*
Sarah Silverman
Bette Midler
Harvey Fierstein
Whoopi Goldberg
Dulcé Sloan
Liz Feldman
Adam Kantor
Camryn Manheim
Milo Manheim
Busy Philipps
Seth Rudetsky
Ari Shapiro
Leigh Silverman

* Rabbis who appeared in the seder.

Performances

Broadcast
The Saturday Night Seder could be seen on BuzzFeed's Tasty YouTube Channel and was simulcasted on Saturday Night Seder's website and the CDC Foundation's website. In total, more than 1 million people watched the Saturday Night Seder.

See also

 Impact of the COVID-19 pandemic on the music industry
 iHeart Living Room Concert for America
 Together at Home

References

External links
 

2020 television specials
American television specials
April 2020 events in the United States
Jewish television
Music television specials
Cultural responses to the COVID-19 pandemic
Simulcasts
Passover seder